The Greater London Council Staff Association (GLCSA) was a trade union representing workers for the London-wide council.

The union was founded in 1909 as the London County Council Staff Association, to represent clerical, technical and professional staff at the London County Council.  It was initially a section of the National Association of Local Government Officers (NALGO), but in 1916 it split from NALGO and became independent.  It held a majority of trade union seats on the Whitley Council for London staff, although membership always remained below 20,000.  While NALGO repeatedly tried to get the union to re-affiliate, association members feared that if it did so, the London Whitley Council would be merged into the national one for local authority workers.

In 1955, the union affiliated to the Trades Union Congress, ten years before NALGO followed suit.  When the London County Council was replaced by the Greater London Council, the union changed its name to the Greater London Council Staff Association.  In later years, it also represented workers at the Inner London Education Authority, London Ambulance Service, Thames Water Authority, and at polytechnics and probation services in the city.

In 1985, the union shortened its name to the Greater London Staff Association (GLSA).  The Greater London Council was abolished in 1986, greatly reducing the union's membership.  As a result, in 1988 it merged into the GMB.

General Secretaries
1955: Laurence Welsh
1963: Frederick Thomas Hollocks
1980s: C. S. Corcoran
1986: Arthur Capelin

References

Defunct trade unions of the United Kingdom
1909 establishments in the United Kingdom
London County Council
Greater London Council
Municipal workers' trade unions
Trade unions established in 1909
Trade unions disestablished in 1988
Trade unions based in London